Eilidh Middleton (born 29 October 1990) is an equestrian competitor from Finzean, Banchory, Aberdeenshire, Scotland.

Sporting achievements

Eilidh has represented Britain at International and University level and won the Student Riders Nations Cup in the Netherlands in 2011 just before graduating with a BA (Hons.) from Robert Gordon University. She has aspirations to achieve Olympian status.

She also plays shinty and was a key part of the RGU ladies' team.

References 

1990 births
Living people
Shinty players
Scottish equestrians
Alumni of Robert Gordon University